Ocellularia pluriporoides is a species of corticolous (bark-dwelling) lichen in the family Graphidaceae. Found in Northern Thailand, it was formally described as a new species in 2002 by lichenologists Natsurang Homchantara and Brian J. Coppins.

The lichen has a shiny and smooth, greenish-grey thallus with a dense cortex and a white medulla. Its thin-walled, colourless ascospores are shaped like narrow ellipsoids, typically measuring 34.5–45.5 long by 7.5–9.0 μm wide. It contains psoromic acid, a secondary compound. The specific epithet pluriporoides refers to its resemblance to Ocellularia pluripora. This lookalike species has smaller spores that are 12-16 μm long.

See also
 List of Ocellularia species

References

pluriporoides
Lichen species
Lichens described in 2002
Lichens of Thailand
Taxa named by Brian John Coppins
Taxa named by Natsurang Homchantara